Kevin Sharp (1970–2014) was an American country music singer.

Kevin Sharp may also refer to:

Kevin Sharp (cricketer) (born 1959), English cricketer
Kevin Sharp (footballer) (born 1974), Canadian-born English footballer
Kevin Sharp, heavy metal/grindcore singer for Venomous Concept and Brutal Truth
Kevin H. Sharp (born 1963), federal judge of the United States District Court for the Middle District of Tennessee

See also 
 Kevin Sharpe (disambiguation)